The Montreal Neurological Institute-Hospital (MNI), also known as Montreal Neuro or The Neuro, is a research and medical centre dedicated to neuroscience, training and clinical care, located in the city's downtown core of Montreal, Quebec, Canada. It is part of the McGill University Health Centre network and it is situated on the southern slope of Mount Royal along the east side of University Street, just north of Pine Avenue. It was founded in 1934 by neurosurgeon Wilder Penfield, who developed the Montreal procedure there for the treatment of epilepsy.

History 
The Montreal Neurological Institute originated from the Sub-Department of Neurosurgery at the Royal Victoria Hospital. The Neuro was created at the RVH in 1933, before it moved to its newly-constructed building across University Street. The cornerstone of The Neuro was laid on October 6, 1933. On September 27, 1934 Sir Edward Beatty, chancellor of McGill University, declared the institute formally opened.

The Rockefeller Foundation provided funds to build and equip the laboratories of the institute and created an endowment fund of one million dollars in support of the scientific work of the Department of Neurology and Neurosurgery. The clinical, or hospital, part of the institute was built through donations from private individuals. The Province of Quebec and the City of Montreal agreed that they would be responsible for the hospital’s yearly operation.

At the end of Penfield’s foundation address, he expressed the hope that the institute would act as a catalyst for Canadian neurology: “We dare to hope that this is the inauguration of an institute of medicine that is characteristically Canadian, the birth of a Canadian School of Neurology.”

Open Science 
In 2016, The Neuro became the first academic institution of its kind in the world to implement in practice the principles of open science,  when the Lawrence and Judith Tanenbaum Family Foundation donated $20 M to establish the Tanenbaum Open Science Institute. 

Dr. Guy Rouleau, the current Director of The Neuro, was awarded the Canada Gairdner Wightman award in 2020, for identifying and elucidating the genetic architecture of neurological and psychiatric diseases, including ALS, autism and schizophrenia, and his leadership in the field of Open Science.

A Killam Institution 
The Montreal Neurological Institute is a Killam Institution, supported by the Killam Trusts. In 1966, the Izaak Walton Killam Memorial Endowment Fund and Fund for Advanced Studies were established at the Montreal Neurological Institute through the bequest of Dorothy Johnston Killam. These funds support the academic and training mission of the Institute.

Directors 
 Wilder Graves Penfield, MD, 1934–1960
 Theodore Brown Rasmussen, MD, 1960–1972
 William Feindel, MD, 1972–1984
 Donald Baxter, MD, 1984–1992 & 2000–2002
 Richard A. Murphy, PhD, 1992–2000
 David R. Colman, PhD, 2002–2011
 Guy Rouleau, MD, PhD, 2011–present

Research Groups 
 Brain tumour
 Cognitive neuroscience
 Epilepsy
 Neuroimmunological diseases
 Neural circuits
 Neurodegenerative diseases
 Neuroimaging and neuroinformatics
 Rare neurological diseases
 Neurodevelopmental disorders

See also 
 Douglas Hospital
 Allen Institute
 Wilder Penfield
 Donald Hebb
 Brenda Milner
 Barbara E. Jones

References 

Hospitals in Montreal
Ville-Marie, Montreal
Research institutes in Canada
McGill University buildings